Todd DeSorbo is the head coach of the  Virginia Cavaliers Swim team at the University of Virginia. He is also a 2020 US Olympic Team Coach.

Career

Personal life

Todd lives in Charlottesville, VA with his wife, Lauren, and their two children.

References

External links
 Virginia profile

Living people
American swimming coaches
University of Virginia people
Year of birth missing (living people)